The Papua New Guinea national rugby union team, nicknamed the Pukpuks, (Tok Pisin for 'crocodiles'),  played its first international in 1966, defeating Vanuatu 47–3. Papua New Guinea have not so far qualified for a Rugby World Cup. They participated in the Oceania World Cup qualifying tournaments for the 2007, 2011 and 2015 World Cups, but did not qualify.

History

Papua New Guinea made their international rugby debut at the South Pacific Games in 1966.

As hosts for the following games held at Port Moresby in 1969, Papua New Guinea defeated New Caledonia again and the  but lost to the eventual gold medalist  to finish with the silver medal.

Papua New Guinea entered a qualifying tournament for the 1999 Rugby World Cup in Wales. Papua New Guinea competed in Round 1 of the Oceania qualifying tournament. Although they defeated Tahiti, they lost 22–19 against the Cook Islands. They finished second in the final standings.

They played in qualifying tournaments for the 2003 Rugby World Cup in Australia, playing in Round 1b of the Oceania tournament. Papua New Guinea defeated both the Solomon Islands and Vanuatu to advance through to Round 3. In Round 3 Papua New Guinea faced the Cook Islands to advance to Round 4. In the final round, for repechage qualification, Papua New Guinea were defeated by Tonga.

In attempting to qualify for the 2007 Rugby World Cup in France, Papua New Guinea started out in Round 1a of the tournament. Papua New Guinea defeated the Solomon Islands and Vanuatu to finish at the top of the standings to move through to Round 2. In Round 2 the Cook Islands went through to Round 4.

The Pukpuks won the inaugural Federation of Oceania Rugby Union (FORU) Cup (2007), defeating Niue in the final by a score of 46–19. In the 2009 Oceania Nations Cup, Papua New Guinea managed to beat Vanuatu 86–12 in the semifinals and in the final, beat Cook Islands 29–12. They then went on to play Samoa in the Oceania Qualification for the 2011 Rugby World Cup where they got beaten 115–7 away and 73–12 at home. They were unable to qualify for the 2011 Rugby World Cup.

Papua New Guinea hosted the 2011 edition of the FORU Oceania Cup, winning the tournament by defeating Vanuatu (78–3), Solomon Islands (33–15) and Niue (36–7)

World Cup record

Overall Records
Below is table of the representative rugby matches played by a Papua New Guinea national XV at test level up until 20 April 2020.

Squad
Squad to Oceania Rugby Men's Championship (12 October 2022):

Aidan Toua - QRU
Jordan Seladi (Capital Rugby Union)
Tony Sipa (Capital Rugby Union)
Freddy Andale (Capital Rugby Union)
Mick Rau (Capital Rugby Union)
Caleb Nipal (Capital Rugby Union)
Eddie Nipal (Capital Rugby Union)
George Wai (Capital Rugby Union)
Barol Homerang (Capital Rugby Union)
Jaran Pittan (Capital Rugby Union)
Ron Butler (Capital Rugby Union)
Kenneth Vagi (Capital Rugby Union)
William Kalai (Capital Rugby Union)
Anu Karai (Capital Rugby Union)
Jonah Tokiong (Capital Rugby Union)
Blake Mindipi (Capital Rugby Union)
Francis Miria (Morobe)
Cameron Wai (Morobe)
Laho Posu (Morobe)
Lindsay Yobone (Morobe)
Paul Nelson (Morobe)
Mafu Kalas (Morobe)
Elias Patala (Morobe)
Eddie Carl Soor (NCD Rugby Union)
Ezekiel Dauko (NCD Rugby Union) 
Brendon Yenmoro (NCD Rugby Union)
Jackson Waingut (NCD Rugby Union)
Keith Frizzel (NCD Rugby Union)
George Mark (East New Britain)
Hosea Alfred (East New Britain)

See also
 Rugby union in Papua New Guinea

References

External links
 Papua New Guinea on IRB.com
 Papua New Guinea on Rugbydata.com
  www.facebook.com

 
Oceanian national rugby union teams
Rugby union in Papua New Guinea